The Land of Happiness (Finnish: Onnen maa) is a 1993 Finnish comedy-drama film, set in the 1960s (when tango was all the rage in Finland), by multiple award-winning Finnish director Markku Pölönen.

Plot
The film stars Finnish actor Pertti Koivula in the lead role as Tenho, a prodigal son with patent leather shoes and dancing skills to match, who returns home to his family's rural farm for the summer after failing to make a living in the city. Tenho's brother Aarne (Taisto Reimaluoto) runs the farm while Grandma ("Mummo") (Anja Pohjola), the boys' mother, as the matriarch, tends to farm chores while caring for her boys' father (Veikko Tiitinen) in his failing physical and mental health. Other characters include Tenho's young nephew Tapi and Tenho's sister-in-law Tuija.

Tenho is immediately put to work on the farm by his brother, but Tenho is not cut out for farm life. He cannot keep up with the work even when he tries, and he does everything possible to get out of helping, even deliberately maiming himself.

Highlights of the film include Tenho's budding romance with the attractive milk maid Virva; it looks like a sure thing until Virva learns about a certain bet involving her that Tenho has made with Aarne. That's when Virva turns to ice and Tenho's feelings change to crazed obsession.

The film also features live performances by Finnish tango musician Reijo Taipale.

Cast
 Katariina Kaitue as Virva
 Pertti Koivula as Tenho Hirvola
 Anja Pohjola as Mummo
 Veikko Tiitinen as Ukki
 Tuula Väänänen as Terttu Anneli Hirvola
 Taisto Reimaluoto as Aarne Tapio Hirvola
 Riikka Räsänen as Tangotyttö
 Tatu Kaihua as Tapani 'Tapi' Ilmari Hirvola
 Heidi Hakkarainen as Tuija
 Reijo Taipale as Tangokuningas
 Carl Mesterton as Saarnamies
 Jukka Puronlahti as Välkky
 Leo Raivio as Hännystelijä
 Esa Halonen as Meijerimies

Awards
The film won the best picture and best screenwriter awards for Pölönen at the 1994 Finnish Jussi Awards, Finland's premier movie accolade.

References

External links 
 

Finnish comedy-drama films
1993 comedy-drama films
1993 films
Films directed by Markku Pölönen
1990s Finnish-language films